Trần Văn Lắm, also known as Charles Trần Văn Lắm (30 July 1913 – 6 February 2001), was a South Vietnamese diplomat and politician, who served as the Minister of Foreign Affairs of the Republic of Vietnam under Prime Minister Trần Thiện Khiêm during the height of the Vietnam War. He was most notable for his role in the Paris Peace Accords that occurred in 1973. In the late 1950s to early 1960s he served as the South Vietnamese Ambassador to both Australia and New Zealand. Lắm served as the President of the Senate of the Republic of Vietnam from 1973 until the Fall of Saigon in 1975.

When Saigon fell in 1975, Trần Văn Lắm was required to sign an undertaking not to take part in any political activities as a condition for his entry into Australia. He moved to Canberra where he and his wife opened a coffee shop. On 6 February 2001, Charles Trần Văn Lắm died in his Canberra home, aged 87.

Early life
The son of a well-to-do ethnic Chinese real estate owner, Tran Van Lam was born in Saigon Cholon. He was educated at Hanoi University and trained as a pharmacist. He was the founding Secretary General of the Vietnam Pharmacists Association before his election to the Saigon City Council in 1952, near the end of French colonial rule.

Rise to power
He moved up to the national legislature and was speaker of the Constituent Assembly in the 1950s and the majority leader of the Assembly after that. In 1961, President Ngo Dinh Diem appointed him ambassador to Australia and New Zealand.

A soft-spoken urbane diplomat fluent in French and English, he remained in the post after Diem's assassination in 1963. Mr. Lam returned to private life as chairman of the Vietnam Commercial and Industrial Bank from 1964 to 1967. In 1969 he became the minister for foreign affairs of South Vietnam.

Media
All Points of the Compass
A Vietnamese Diaspora (2005)
Directed by Judy Rymer, Australian Broadcasting Corporation 

Charles Trần Van Lam had the ill-fated destiny to be foreign minister of South Vietnam during the devastating war with the North. He was a patriot, committed to seeing his country emerge from its colonial history. He was also the father of nine children, who with his wife formed a seemingly privileged family, which dined together, had vacations at the beach, learned musical instruments, and were instilled with their Vietnamese identity. As the war intensified, he and his wife made provisions for the children to leave the country. The nine children were dispersed to Australia, France, the U.S. and Scotland. The hope was that they would be educated abroad and bring their talents back to their native country.

That was not to be. Trần Van Lam was betrayed by the United States, his ally against the North. While he was a delegate to the Paris peace talks, Henry Kissinger secretly arranged the pull out with the North. Fortunate to be airlifted out at the fall of Saigon, he and his wife finally emigrated to Australia with one small bag, where they ultimately opened a coffee shop.

The adult children, now in mid -career with families of their own, speak poignantly about their experience of dislocation. They each longed to be re-united as a family and had to struggle to forge a new identity in a foreign land. They were all deeply affected by their father's expectations to become accomplished and"give back." Each one feels "multicultural." All Points of the Compass is at once a gripping portrait of the "immigrant experience" and a new perspective on the American role in the Vietnam War.

Best Documentary, ACT Film Awards, 2004
Bilan du Film Ethnographic, Paris, 2005

See also
 Vietnamese Australian

References

External links
 http://www.abc.net.au/tv/guide/netw/200505/programs/ZY7551A001D1052005T193000.htm "All Points of the Compass" ABC TV Guide
 https://web.archive.org/web/20070927092445/http://www.filmakers.com/indivs/AllPointsCompass.htm 
 http://www.abc.net.au/abccontentsales/s1171924.htm  www.abc.net.au/abccontentsales/s1171924.htm
 http://www.abc.net.au/programsales/s1216105.htm
 http://www.theage.com.au/news/TV--Radio/A-loving-story/2005/04/27/1114462046661.html "A Loving Story" The Age, 28 April 2005
 http://nla.gov.au/nla.cs-pa-HTTP%253A%252F%252FNAA12.NAA.GOV.AU%252FSCRIPTS%252FSEARCHOLD.ASP%253FO%253DPSI2%2526NUMBER%253D8905763 - Charles Tran Van Lam presenting a cheque to the University of Sydney Chancellor on 6 October 1963
 https://web.archive.org/web/20070927234903/http://www.rummage.com.au/AAPView.aspx?id=101432 - Article: 22 April 2005, Sydney
 http://ozevents.blogspot.com/2005_05_01_archive.html
 https://web.archive.org/web/20070927035355/http://timelines.ws/countries/VIETNAMA.HTML Vietnam Timeline from 600 BC through 1973
 https://query.nytimes.com/gst/fullpage.html?res=940DE1D6103DF933A15750C0A9679C8B63
 http://www.nixonlibrary.gov/forresearchers/find/tapes/finding_aids/january1973.php  Nixom White House Tapes
https://www.youtube.com/watch?v=WDUSNb-GO0s South Vietnamese Senate Chairman Charles Tran Van Lam speaks about South Vietnam's disappointment in the USA

Vietnamese people of the Vietnam War
Australian people of Chinese descent
1913 births
2001 deaths
South Vietnamese politicians
Members of the National Assembly (South Vietnam)
Government ministers of Vietnam
Hoa people
Ambassadors of Vietnam to Australia
Ambassadors of Vietnam to New Zealand